Francisco Javier "Javi" Pérez Páez (born 27 January 1986) is a Spanish footballer who plays as a central midfielder for SP Villafranca.

Club career
Born in Córdoba, Andalusia, Pérez was a Córdoba CF youth graduate, and made his senior debut while on loan at Recreativo de Bailén in January 2006. In July, he returned to the Verdiblancos, being assigned to the reserves in the Tercera División.

Pérez made his first team debut on 6 December 2008, coming on as a late substitute for Yordi in a 1–3 away loss against Elche CF in the Segunda División. He left the club at the end of the season, and subsequently signed for RSD Alcalá in Segunda División B.

Pérez continued to appear in the lower leagues in the following years, representing CD Pozoblanco, Extremadura UD (two stints), Martos CD (two stints), CD San Roque de Lepe, CD Puertollano and CD Badajoz.

On 20 July 2018, Pérez was demoted to Extremadura's reserve team after accepting an offer to become a director of the youth setup.

References

External links

1986 births
Living people
Footballers from Córdoba, Spain
Spanish footballers
Association football midfielders
Segunda División players
Segunda División B players
Tercera División players
Tercera Federación players
Córdoba CF B players
Córdoba CF players
CD San Roque de Lepe footballers
Martos CD footballers
CD Puertollano footballers
RSD Alcalá players
Extremadura UD footballers
CD Badajoz players
Extremadura UD B players